Corumbataia cuestae is a species of armored catfish endemic to Brazil where it is found in small streams of the Tietê River (upper Paraná River basin).  This species grows to a length of  SL.

References

Otothyrinae
Fish of South America
Fish of Brazil
Endemic fauna of Brazil
Taxa named by Heraldo Antonio Britski
Fish described in 1997